The Supreme Court of Ukraine is the highest judicial body in the system of courts of general jurisdiction in Ukraine.

The Court derives its authority from the Constitution of Ukraine, but much of its structure is outlined in legislation. A more detailed description of the Court's functions and authority may be found in the Law of Ukraine "On the Judiciary and the Status of Judges".

Structure
The Court consists of several judicial chambers (on criminal, civil, administrative, and arbitration (commercial) cases and the Grand Chamber of the Supreme Court). In July 2010 functions of the Court was severely limited. But in November 2011 the functions of the Court were broadened and the number of judges became 48.

Appointments to the Court are made after candidates selected in a competition are vetted by the Supreme Council of Justice, which then draws up a final list of candidates for the Supreme Court. After a relevant presidential decree, these candidates become judges of the Supreme Court. Each member of the Court (as with every judge in Ukraine) is obliged to retire at the age of 65.

The Chairman of the Supreme Court is elected to office and dismissed from office by the Plenary Assembly of the Court by secret ballot.

The Supreme Court consists of:
 Grand Chamber of the Supreme Court;
 Administrative Court of Cassation;
 Commercial Court of Cassation;
 Criminal Court of Cassation;
 Civil Court of Cassation.

Courts of Cassation within the Supreme Court
Each court of cassation consists of judges of the relevant specialization. Also, in each court of cassation, judicial chambers are formed to consider certain categories of cases, taking into account the specialization of judges. The number, personnel and specialization of court chambers are determined by the decision of the meeting of judges of the Court of Cassation. The legislation defines the mandatory establishment of the following separate chambers within the Administrative Court of Cassation and the Commercial Court of Cassation of the Supreme Court:
 In the Administrative Court of Cassation - for consideration of cases concerning:
taxes, fees and other obligatory payments;
protection of social rights;
electoral process and referendum, as well as protection of political rights of citizens.

 In the Commercial Court of Cassation - to consider cases concerning:
bankruptcy;
protection of intellectual property rights, as well as related to antitrust and competition law;
corporate disputes, corporate rights and securities.

Other chambers in the courts of cassation are established by the decision of the meeting of judges of the court of cassation.

 Judicial chambers of the Court of Cassation:
administer justice in the manner prescribed by procedural law;

analyze judicial statistics and study judicial practice;

exercise other powers specified by law.

The Judicial Chamber is headed by the Secretary of the Judicial Chamber, and in his absence, the duties of the Secretary are performed by the judge of the Chamber who has the longest experience as a judge of the relevant Court of Cassation.

The Grand Chamber of the Supreme Court
The Grand Chamber of the Supreme Court is a permanent collegial body of the Supreme Court, which is formed by electing five judges from each court of cassation in the Supreme Court. The President of the Supreme Court is a member of the Grand Chamber ex officio. However, a judge elected to the Grand Chamber and the President of the Supreme Court do not administer justice in the relevant court of cassation. A judge (other than the President of the Supreme Court) shall serve as a judge of the Grand Chamber for three years, but not more than two consecutive terms.

History
The first Supreme Court of Ukraine was established on December 15, 1917 as the General Court of the Ukrainian People's Republic. It was the first national court established since the liquidation of the Hetmanate in the 18th century. Soon after, on January 17, 1918 the Communist government of Ukraine People's Secretariat declared the creation of the People's Court of Ukraine.

The Court consisted of 15 judges elected by the Central Council of Ukraine after being proposed by the General Secretariat of Ukraine. The competence of the elected judges was gradually extended until the adoption of the Constitution of Ukraine by the All-Ukrainian Constituent Assembly. The Office of Prosecutor was established within the General Court and headed by the Senior Prosecutor who was appointed by the Secretary of Court Affairs (Minister of Justice).

The first judges to the court were elected on January 15, 1918 among whom were M. Pukhtynsky, P. Achkasov, O. Butovsky, F. Popov, M. Radchenko, O. Khrutsky, Serhiy Shelukhin, and H. Shyianov. These were later joined by P. Yatsenko, M. Vasylenko, Kostyantyn Tovkach, Arnold D. Margolin, M. Cherniavsky, Bohdan Kistiakivsky and Ihor Kistiakivsky. The Senior Prosecutor appointed was Dmytro Markovych.

On July 8, 1918, the Hetman of Ukraine completely changed the upper echelon of judicial jurisdiction in the country.

The court in Soviet Ukraine was established on March 11, 1923. It moved into the 18th-century Klov Palace in 2003.

According to a 2009 poll, overall trust in the Court in Ukraine is very low.

In the judicial reform introduced in 2016, three courts were abolished and its tasks transferred to special chambers of the Supreme Court of Ukraine:
 The High Specialized Court on Civil and Criminal Cases, covering civil and criminal cases;
 The High Administrative Court of Ukraine, covering administrative cases;
 The High Commercial Court of Ukraine, covering commercial cases.

Heads

Soviet period

Independent period

Sources and references

External links 
 Official website (Ukrainian and English) 
 
 
  Law of Ukraine "On the Judiciary and the Status of Judges", as amended
 General Court of Ukraine. Jurist Dictionary - Handbook.
 Government of Ukraine – court overview

 
Government of Ukraine
Ukraine
Judiciary of Ukraine
Courts in Ukraine
1917 establishments in Ukraine
Courts and tribunals established in 1917